Markovo is a rural locality (a village) in Niginskoye Rural Settlement, Nikolsky District, Vologda Oblast, Russia. The population was 156 as of 2002.

Geography 
Markovo is located 28 km northwest of Nikolsk (the district's administrative centre) by road. Filinsky is the nearest rural locality.

References 

Rural localities in Nikolsky District, Vologda Oblast